Sir Harold Basil Houldsworth, 2nd Baronet (21 July 1922 – 24 March 1990) was a British anæsthetist and Liberal Party politician.

Background
He was the son of Sir Hubert Houldsworth, 1st Baronet and Hilda Frances Clegg. He was educated at Heckmondwike Grammar School, Huddersfield Technical College and Leeds University, where he qualified as a doctor. In 1946 he married Norah Clifford Halmshaw. They had one daughter. When his father died on 1 February 1956, he inherited the Baronetcy.

Professional career
He was senior anaesthetist at Leeds General Infirmary from 1946-48. In 1948 he was called up to serve in the Royal Army Medical Corps and was given the rank of captain. In 1950 he was appointed the Registrar Anæsthetist at Leeds General Infirmary and St James Hospital, Leeds. In 1953 he was appointed Senior Registrar at Sheffield City General Hospital. He was Consultant Anæsthetist at Barnsley and District Hospitals from 1954–87.

Political career
He came from a family with a Liberal tradition. His father contested Pudsey and Otley as Liberal candidate at the 1929 General Election. His mother was elected a Liberal member of the West Riding County Council. He was Liberal candidate for the new Gloucestershire West division at the 1950 General Election. He came third;

He did not stand for parliament again.

References

1922 births
1990 deaths
Liberal Party (UK) parliamentary candidates
Alumni of the University of Leeds
British anaesthetists
20th-century British medical doctors
Baronets in the Baronetage of the United Kingdom
20th-century British Army personnel
Royal Army Medical Corps officers